"Why Don't You & I" is a song by American rock band Santana. The song was written by Chad Kroeger and recorded for Santana's 2002 album Shaman, on the Arista record label. It was re-recorded in 2003 with vocals by Alex Band of the Calling and released as the third single in the United States on June 16, 2003. Both versions of the single charted in the US while the Alex Band version peaked at number 21 in New Zealand. According to Kroeger when recording for his version of the song, he recorded his vocals while on tour with Nickelback and used panty hose as a pop filter when recording it.

Re-recording and single release
When Arista wanted to release the single in mid-2003, Roadrunner Records, the record label for Nickelback, refused permission citing concerns that Kroeger appearing on a "high-profile single" would compromise the excitement over Nickelback's fall 2003 release The Long Road and hurt the Nickelback album sales. Kroeger recommended Band, another BMG artist, to re-record the song's vocals for single release. The Alex Band version omits the guitar instrumental bridge, and was also included on Ultimate Santana.

Produced and arranged by Lester Mendez, the song reached number eight on the US Billboard Hot 100 chart on October 25, 2003. "Why Don't You & I" is Santana's sixth and last single to date to reach the top 10 in the US.

Track listing

Personnel
Personnel are adapted from the CD single liner notes insert.

 Carlos Santana – lead guitar, keyboards
 Chad Kroeger – lead vocals
 Alex Band – lead vocals 
 Chester Thompson – keyboards (Hammond B3)
 Karl Perazzo – percussion
 Jesus "Chuchi" Jorge – trumpet, trombone
 Ed Calle – saxophone
 Lester Mendez – keyboards; horn arrangement
 Tim Pierce – additional guitars
 R. J. Ronquillo – additional guitars
 Lee Sklar – chorus bass

Charts

Weekly charts

Year-end charts

All-time charts

References

2003 singles
Music videos directed by Marc Webb
Santana (band) songs
Songs written by Chad Kroeger
Song recordings produced by Lester Mendez